Iksane (Tarifit: Iksan, ⵉⴽⵙⴰⵏ; Arabic: إيكسان) is a commune in the Nador Province of the Oriental administrative region of Morocco. At the time of the 2004 census, the commune had a total population of 9001 people living in 1744 households.

References

Populated places in Nador Province
Rural communes of Oriental (Morocco)